Sherford may refer to the following places in England:

Sherford (new town), in Devon
Sherford (near Kingsbridge), a village in Devon
Sherford, Dorset, a location
Sherford, Somerset, an area of Taunton
the River Sherford, in Dorset